Chipwi Township (Chibwe Township) is a township of Myitkyina District in the Kachin State of Burma. The principal town is Chipwi.

Towns and villages

Akyauk, Atang, Aukan, Awngchit, Ba-le, Bamhkam, Bamyaw, Chechin, Chiglai, Chih-ko, Chikgaw, Chiloi, Chipwi, Chu-iho, Chyangzan, Chyingtaw, Chyinhtaung, Gawlamten, Gawyawm, Hkamkawn, Hkasuhpa, Hkayazahkuso, Hkinchit, Hpala, Hpare, Hpyithpyaw, Htangprai, Htawgaw, Htawmshing, Htingra, Ichake, Kangfang, Ko-hkang, Lagut, Lagwi, La-hok, Laichupo, Lakyawn, Lamuk, Langyang, Laokam, Laotiki, Lasin, La-tai, Lauhkang, La-uho, Laukkam, Lauksauk, Launggyaung, Launghpam, Laungkaw, Lawngkyaw, Lontin, Luchang, Lukpwi, Luksang, Lungpang, Machulo, Magawng, Mang-ai, Mangpyaw, Mangtong, Mansan, Matao, Mukhkaung, Mukkaung, Mukyaw, Mum, Myauknaw, Myukhpyaw, Nahpaung, Nakyam, Nalaw, Nang-u, Napok, Nasup, Nayang, Ngamaw, Ngawagyalaw, Ngawapaka, Ngawlawngtam, Paingmaw, Pammyaw, Pangli, Pangmawjang, Pawahku, Pawngen, Pawzang, Pwisang, Pyiloi, Rgangkum, Rgangpi, Ritjaw, Ritpan, Ritsang, Rittong, Rukchaung, Sadulaw, Sanliangho, Sanyu, Saulang, Sawlaw, Sawnkyawn, Sha-an, Shachinpok, Shalaw, Sha-on, Shaotangpa, Shapok, Shapyi, Shijang, Shimao, Shitzaw, Sinhkung, Sipe-hkalaw, Taiawhtu, Talam, Tamna, Tamtu, Tangahka, Tangkyin, Tangtong, Tangtung, Taumangyang, Tawngkaw, Tawung, Theyaw, Tingram, Tsawlang, Tsonma, Tumpyaw, Tunhpaung, Valao, Wachao, Wachutaing, Wachyawn, Wakyang, Wa-na, Wanghte, Wasawng, Washawma, Wasok, Wuhpatu, Wusaohkao, Wutze, Yinchyingpa, Yindam

References

 
Townships of Kachin State